Saint Agatha is a 1630–1633 painting by Francisco de Zurbarán, bought by the French town of Montpellier in 1852 for 1540 francs and now in the city's Musée Fabre.

References

1633 paintings
Paintings by Francisco de Zurbarán
Paintings in the collection of the Musée Fabre
Zurbaran